Maja "Maya" Berović (born 8 July 1987) is a Bosnian-Serbian singer. Born in Ilijaš, she debuted in 2007 with the album Život uživo, featuring her first hit "Džin i limunada".

It was followed by Crno zlato (2008) and Maya (2011), which included stand-out tracks "Crno zlato" and "Djevojačko prezime". Djevojka sa juga (2012) and Opasne vode (2014) were than released to more significant success in Serbia than her previous projects. Berović gained more regional popularity by collaborating with rappers Jala Brat and Buba Corelli on her subsequent albums Viktorijina tajna (2017) and 7 (2018), which spawned hits like "To me radi" and "Pravo vreme". To promote the albums she embarked on regional tours, which included a sold-out show in the Belgrade Arena. In 2020, she released her eighth album Intime.

Early life
Maja Berović was born 8 July 1987 in the village of Malešići, part of the Ilijaš municipality near Sarajevo, Bosnia and Herzegovina, to Serb parents. Her birth name was often falsely reported as "Maida" and her ethnicity has been disputed in the media. She lost her father when she was three years old. Berović lived in Malešići alongside her mother and older brother until the end of the Bosnian War in 1995, when she relocated to Bratunac where her mother was originally from. In a 2016 interview, Berović described her childhood during the Bosnian War: 
In Bratunac, she attended school and first began practising music. From the age of 12 she used to sing in local discothèques every weekend until she turned 18. Berović grew up listening to artists such as Dragana Mirković, Lepa Brena and Ceca and lists them as her musical influences.

Career

2006-2015: Career beginnings
Berović pursued a career in music as a teenager when she was signed to the Belgrade-based record label Grand Production through which she released her debut studio album Život uživo in August 2007. It included eight tracks written by Serbian lyricist Marina Tucaković and composer Aleksandar Milić Mili. Život uživo spawned her first stand-out hit "Džin i limunada". Her sophomore album, Crno zlato, was released in December the following year under IN Music. Her third eponymous album, Maya, was released in February 2011 featuring popular ballad "Djevojačko prezime", which was declared the Hit of the Year in Sarajevo.

In October 2012, Berović released Djevojka sa juga under City Records. The following year, she held her first performance in Belgrade. In April 2014, Berović participated in Pink Music Festival with a club-oriented song called "Alkohol". The song served as the lead single for her next album, Opasne vode, which was released on 27 October 2014. In addition to an updated and slightly different sound, the new record was also accompanied by a new image. Both Devojka sa juga and Opasne vode were sold in the circulation of 50,000 copies.

2016-2019: Viktorijina tajna and 7
In March 2016, Berović released her single "Pauza" singing in Ekavian dialect instead of Ijekavian, which is dominantly spoken in Bosnia. The transition saw criticism from the audience, which perceived that Maya was trying to appeal more to Serbian market. In her own defense, Berović stated that the choice was made due to the fact that the song was written by Serbian songwriters. However, she continued singing in Ekavian even when working with Bosnian songwriters.

On her 29th birthday, Berović released "To me radi" featuring Bosnian rappers Jala Brat and Buba Corelli. She continued working with the duo on her commercially acclaimed album Viktorijina tajna, which was released on 2 July 2017 through City Records. It was sold in 50,000 copies. All nine music videos from the album have collectively accumulated over 340 million views on YouTube, as of December 2022.  To promote it, Berović embarked on a regional tour which also included dates in the United States. 

The following July, she released her subsequent seventh studio album through XL Elit Invest. It included nine tracks, written by Jala Brat and Buba Corelli, which have collectively as of December 2022 amassed over 350 million views and over 18 million streams on Spotify. The album featured a duet titled "Pravo vreme" with Buba Corelli, which alone has collected over 130 million views and is recognized as one of the most viewed music videos by an Ex-Yu artist. In November 2018, as a part of her regional tor, also called Pravo vreme, Berović performed a sold-out show in the Belgrade Arena. According to media reports, the concert was also one of the fastest selling events in the venue's history.  

On 1 November 2019, she released two standalone singles, "Zmaj" and "Uloga", which would become her last collaborations with Jala and Buba.

2020: Intime and future projects
In July 2020, Berović held an online concert via Serbian streaming service YouBox. It was viewed by 260,000 people.  On 6 August the same year, Maya released her eight studio album Intime. The songs from the album were dominantly written by music duo Alex and Nikki Caneras. Intime is consisted of ten tracks accompanied by music videos, which have collectively accumulated over a hundred million views by the end of the year. In October, Berović released a makeup collection titled Maya Beauty Line.

Her song "Alkohol" was featured in the 2022 Netflix movie The Swimmers. In December 2022, Maya announced her next album with the release of the lead single "Ale ale", which covered the song by Albanian singer Xhensila Myrtezaj.

Personal life
On 31 July 2016, Berović married Alen Dragosav. On 21 February 2022, Berović welcomed her first son, named Lav.

She currently reside between Graz, Austria and Belgrade, Serbia. Berović is an Eastern Orthodox Christian.

Maya reached the milestone of one million followers on Instagram in October 2020.

Philanthropy
In July 2019, Berović showed her support for the LGBTQ+ community in Bosnia and Herzegovina by inviting people to the first ever Sarajevo Pride, held on 8 September 2019.

Discography
Studio albums
Život uživo (2007)
Crno zlato (2008)
Maya (2011)
Djevojka sa juga (2012)
Opasne vode (2014)
Viktorijina tajna (2017)
7 (2018)
Intime (2020)

References

External links
 
 

1987 births
Living people
People from Ilijaš
People from Bratunac
21st-century Bosnia and Herzegovina women singers
Bosnia and Herzegovina folk-pop singers
Grand Production artists
City Records artists
BN Music artists
Serbs of Bosnia and Herzegovina
Eastern Orthodox Christians from Bosnia and Herzegovina
Bosnia and Herzegovina expatriates in Serbia
Bosnia and Herzegovina expatriates in Austria